Cador (Latin: Cadorius) was a legendary Duke of Cornwall, known chiefly through Geoffrey of Monmouth's pseudohistorical Historia Regum Britanniae and previous manuscript sources such as the Life of Carantoc. 

Early sources present Cador as a relative of King Arthur, though the details of their kinship are usually left unspecified.

Historicity
Many stories involving Arthurian figures were likely passed down orally, which has led to many different interpretations and versions of the people and characters mentioned. Scholars generally question the historical accuracy of these tales. Evidence shows that people like Arthur may have been real historical figures. However, most of the deeds of Arthur have been discredited. Because of this, the people he is associated with and their stories could be solely a part of the orally passed down myths of Arthur's legacy and not true history.

One of these figures was Cado, a successor of Geraint ab Erbin and a close associate of Arthur. Cador, the Duke of Cornwall, was a member that was summoned to Arthur's court. While it seems that Cador the Duke of Cornwall could have been a real historical figure, interpretations and stories that include him are very diverse in their information so understanding the true historical context of figures like him is difficult. Sources like King Arthur: The Truth Behind the Legend explain how the Arthurian history has been mixed with fact and fiction which means many events and figures could not have been accurate, “The Arthurian saga is nevertheless much more than a hotchpotch of tales made up by medieval minstrels, and it is essential to try to separate the Arthur of the romances—the Arthur of Geoffrey of Monmouth, Thomas Malory and the medieval troubadours—from the historical Arthur—the dark age warrior on whom all the rest of the super-structure was built”. Scholars were able to narrow down the true historical facts of Arthur's life to two things, “Some scholars have taken everything out, argued everything away, leaving just two brief mentions in the Easter Annals: 516: Battle of Badon, in which Arthur carried the cross of our Lord Jesus Christ on his shoulders for three days and three nights, and the British were victors. 537: Strife of Camlann, in which Arthur and Medraut perished [or fell]” (King Arthur: The Truth Behind the Legend). However, there is still a lot of information that is debatable of being facts or a part of the pseudohistory. Arthur, who died May 21, 542 A.D., gave his crown to Constantine who was the son of Cador the Duke of Cornwall noting the possible time period and years in which Cador could have lived.

Name
The name “Cador” does not match any early Welsh sources, so the name itself comes either the misinterpretation of the Harley genealogy name “Catgur” or the British “Catigern”. Both names are interpreted similarly showing that the name Cador means "battle notable" or "fighter" due to the fact that “Cat” means battle and “Gur” means man or warrior while “Tigern” means leader. Where the name Cador came from is a mystery due to the fact that it is not found in early Welsh sources, but it was very easy for letters to be dropped out of “Catgur” or “Catigern” causing the name Cador to be formed. Cador, who was mainly mentioned by Geoffrey of Monmouth, has also been called/recognized by two other names: Cado and Cadwy in different works like Myvyrian, Life of S. Carannog, and early fifteenth century pedigrees. His title Duke of Cornwall was also a title that took on different forms over history because Cornwall was once a part of the Roman civitas Dumnonia, giving Cador the name King of Dumnonia which is recognizable in many works.

Origins and relations
Cador was reputed to be the son of Geraint ( Latin Gerontius, Cornish Gerrens ) who was a King of Dumnonia and a historic hero that died quite early leaving his rule to Hoel because Cador was not at a proper age for leadership. He was known to have children himself who go by the names Constantine (Welsh Custennin)  Peredur, and Cadoc. He had shared lineage with King Arthur due to the fact that he was the great grandson of Arthur's Duke, based on the idea of Custennyn and Constantine genealogies being equivalent to each other. 

Cador also had three brothers by the names of Cyngar, Iestyn, and Selyf who are all saints of Llancarfan and are mentioned to be related to Cador in the Myvyrian. Along with his brothers, Cador was known to have a sister named Gurguint who was married to Caradoc Vreichfas who was a legend in Welsh history and was alive during the same time period as Arthur. Many historians believe Caradoc Vreichfas to be synonymous with Cerdic of Wessex, the Anglo-Saxon founder of the House of Wessex and first king of Saxon Wessex (reign 519-534). 
According to writings from Geoffrey, Cador was married to a woman named Ygerna, who was courted and tricked by Arthur's father Uther Pendragon while Cador was away in battle. Cador is also thought to have been related to Arthur because  he is addressed as so in different texts. Layamon, an English poet, writes that Arthur said, “Cador, thou art mine own kin”(King Arthur's Children: A Study in Fiction and Tradition, pg.98). However, it is also made known in some works that Constantine, who was established to be Cador's son, was Arthur's cousin making Cador a possible in-law relative rather than through blood.

Cador’s battles
Cador's battles are not recorded in the Historia Brittonum Arthurian Battle list but are mentioned in many different works. He battled in Saxons, and oversea impending force to Arthur, as they were on their way to York. Before they reached that place, Cador used his army to defeat them and took over York. After the defeat, the Saxons surrender to a pledge of peace and retreat. The Saxons break the pledge of peace they made an oath to while on sea, which leads to another battle between the Saxons and Arthur. In that battle, Cador killed the Saxon leader named Chelric. His next big battle was at Camblan although there were a few little altercations in between like the Roman War. At the battle at Camblan, Cador is found dead with some of his troops, thus marking an end to his battles.

Historia Regum Britanniae/Arthurian pseudohistory
Cador, Duke of Cornwall, appears in Geoffrey of  Monmouth's Historia Regum Britanniae (ca. 1135). He is a man of power, as he is referred to as both a duke (dux) and a king (rex) throughout the text. He is known best for his heroism in the battles in York and Isle of Thanet told in Historia Regum Britanniae. Although he is highlighted for his great strength and involvement as a hero, none of Cador's battles appear in the Arthurian Battle list. The legitimacy and accuracy of Cador's involvement with these wars remain in question by scholars. He is successful in both battles, easily defeating the army in York as well as killing the leader of the Saxon barbarians, Chelric, on the Isle of Thanet. Arthur's most successful siege, the Battle of Bath, proceeds the battle at the Isle of Thanet: strangely illogical given the timeline. Even so, Cador undermines the success of Arthur as he won against the Saxons in a far off region. Historians from both Saxony and Britain do not note on any battle occurring in that region until the sixth century. The legitimacy of this battle could be completely fabricated for literary purposes.

Anglo-Saxon Chronicle
Scholars have speculated that the legitimacy of Cador's battles can be found through the Anglo-Saxon Chronicle, presumably written by Alfred the Great. Since there is only one named British Commander, Vortigern, scholars have aligned the timelines in the Anglo-Saxon Chronicle and the Historia Regum Britanniae to assess the legitimacy of Cador. Many similarities between the battles can be noted. There is an encounter in York, or along the Canterbury-London road with anywhere between 3,000 and 4,000 British soldiers. Here, Arthur and the British retreat to London in both versions of history. The next battle with the supposed Cador is in Thanet, which is noted in both Anglo-Saxon Chronicle and Historia Regum Britanniae. The British Commander in the Anglo-Saxon Chronicle, despite being unnamed, is speculated to be the Cador in Historia Regum Britanniae because of the similarities.

Historical ruler
Cado was the historical son of a Dumnonian king named Gerrens whom he succeeded as monarch.  Traditionally he was a good friend of Arthur; they even ruled together in the Vita Sanctus Carantoci (Life of St. Carantoc). He also seemed to share a good relationship with King Caradoc of Gwent. Possibly he gave his name to four hillforts, all named Cadbury which may be "Cado's fort", one each near to Clevedon, Congresbury and Sparkford in Somerset and one by the Exe in Devon north of Crediton.  Cadson Bury hill fort lies just outside Callington, also known as Celliwig in Cornwall.

Legend
In Geoffrey's History and elsewhere, Arthur's future queen Guinevere was raised as Cador's ward. Cador is also said to be of Roman stock. His son Constantine was given the kingship of Britain by Arthur as the latter lay ailing on the field of Camlann. To the Brut Tysilio the translator adds the information that Cador was son of Gorlois, presumably by Igraine, which would make him Arthur's maternal half-brother. This same text also gives Cador a son, Mayric, who dies fighting the Romans. The same account appears in Richard Hardyng's Chronicle where Cador is called Arthur's brother "of his mother's syde." In Layamon's Brut Cador appears as a leader who takes charge of Uther's host when they are attacked by Gorlois while Uther is secretly lying beside Igraine in Tintagel. Most works, such as the English Alliterative Morte Arthure and Malory's Le Morte d'Arthur, however, call Cador Arthur's "cousin", though in the Alliterative text Arthur calls Cador his sister's son.

William Worcester travelled to Cornwall in 1478, and recorded in his Itineraries that "Tador Duke of Cornwall, husband of the mother of Arthur was slain" at Castle an Dinas. This is sometimes read as Cador, and is generally interpreted as a conflation of Cador with Gorlois (the husband of Igraine in Historia Regum Britanniae), but likely reflects a local tradition, as the Historia is the only authority for Gorlois as Igraine's husband.

In The Dream of Rhonabwy, a medieval romance associated with the Mabinogion Cador is "Cadwr Earl of Cornwall, the man whose task it is to arm the king on the day of battle and conflict" – i.e. at the Battle of Badon Hill, which the writer situates close to the upper River Severn.

References

British traditional history
Knights of the Round Table
Monarchs of Cornwall